George Bird Grinnell (September 20, 1849 – April 11, 1938) was an American anthropologist, historian, naturalist, and writer.  Grinnell was born in Brooklyn, New York, and graduated from Yale University with a B.A. in 1870 and a Ph.D. in 1880.  Originally specializing in zoology, he became a prominent early conservationist and student of Native American life.  Grinnell has been recognized for his influence on public opinion and work on legislation to preserve the American bison. Mount Grinnell in Glacier National Park in Montana is named after Grinnell.

Exploration and conservation
Grinnell had extensive contact with the terrain, animals and Native Americans of the northern plains, starting with being part of the last great hunt of the Pawnee in 1872.  He spent many years studying the natural history of the region.  As a graduate student, he accompanied Lieutenant Colonel George Armstrong Custer’s 1874 Black Hills expedition as a naturalist. He declined a similar appointment to the ill-fated 1876 Little Big Horn expedition.

In 1875, Colonel William Ludlow, who had been part of Custer's gold exploration effort, invited Grinnell to serve as naturalist and mineralogist on an expedition to Montana and the newly established Yellowstone Park.  Grinnell prepared an attachment to the expedition's report, in which he documented the poaching of buffalo, deer, elk and antelope for hides. "It is estimated that during the winter of 1874-1875, not less than 3,000 Buffalo and mule deer suffer even more severely than the elk, and the antelope nearly as much." His experience in Yellowstone led Grinnell to write the first of many magazine articles dealing with conservation, the protection of the buffalo, and the American West.

Grinnell made hunting trips to the St. Mary Lakes region of what is now Glacier National Park in 1885, 1887 and 1891 in the company of James Willard Schultz, the first professional guide in the region.  During the 1885 visit, Grinnell and Schultz while traveling up the Swiftcurrent valley observed the glacier that now bears his name.  Along with Schultz, Grinnell participated in the naming of many features in the Glacier region.  He was later influential in establishing Glacier National Park in 1910. He was also a member of the Edward Henry Harriman expedition of 1899, a two-month survey of the Alaskan coast by an elite group of scientists and artists.
 
Grinnell was prominent in movements to preserve wildlife and conservation in the American West.  Grinnell wrote articles to help spread the awareness of the conservation of buffalo. For many years, he published articles and lobbied for congressional support for the endangered American buffalo.  In 1887, Grinnell was a founding member, with Theodore Roosevelt, of the Boone and Crockett Club, dedicated to the restoration of America's wildlands.  Other founding members included General William Tecumseh Sherman and Gifford Pinchot.  Grinnell and Roosevelt published the Club's first book in 1895.  Grinnell also organized the first Audubon Society and was an organizer of the New York Zoological Society.

With the passage of the 1894 National Park Protective Act, the remaining 200 wild buffalo in Yellowstone National Park received a measure of protection.  It was nearly too late for the species.  Poaching continued to reduce the animal's population, which reached its lowest number of 23 in 1902.  Grinnell's actions led to ongoing efforts by the Department of Interior to find additional animals in the wild and to manage herds to supplement the Yellowstone herd.  This ultimately led to a genetically pure viable herd, and the survival of the species.
 
Grinnell was editor of Forest and Stream magazine from 1876 to 1911.  He contributed many articles and essays to magazines and professional publications, including: 
 "In Buffalo Days", in American Big-Game Hunting, edited by Theodore Roosevelt and George Bird Grinnell, New York, 1893.
 "The Bison," in Musk-Ox, Bison, Sheep and Goat, edited by Caspar Whitney, George Bird Grinnell, and Owen Wister, New York, 1904 American Sportsman's Library.

Ethnology of the Plains cultures
Grinnell’s books and publications reflect his lifelong learnings about the ways of northern American plains and the Plains tribes.  Along with J. A. Allen and William T. Hornaday, Grinnell was a historian of the buffalo and their relationship to Plains tribal culture.  In When Buffalo Ran (1920), he describes hunting and working buffalo from a buffalo horse.

Grinnell’s best-known works are on the Cheyenne, including The Fighting Cheyennes (1915),  and a two-volume work, The Cheyenne Indians: Their History and Lifeways (1923).  His principal informant for both books was George Bent, a Cheyenne of mixed race who had fought for the Confederacy during the Civil War. George E. Hyde may have done much of the writing.

In 1928, Grinnell explored the story of brothers Major Frank North and Captain Luther H. North, who led Pawnee Scouts for the US Army. In other works on the Plains culture area, he focused on the Pawnee and Blackfeet people: Pawnee Hero Stories (1889), Blackfoot Lodge Tales (1892), and The Story of the Indian (1895).

Of his work, President Theodore Roosevelt said:

Selected papers by Grinnell were edited by J. F. Reiger in 1972.

Death and burial

Grinnell died April 11, 1938, and is interred in Woodlawn Cemetery in the Bronx, New York City.

Selected worksPawnee Hero Stories and Folk-Tales (1889) (Reprint: University of Nebraska Press, 1961)Blackfoot Lodge Tales (1892) (Reprint: BiblioBazaar, 2006) Hunting In Many Lands: The Book Of The Boone And Crockett Club (1895) (Reprint: Kessinger Publishing, 2007) The Story of the Indian (1895)The Indians of Today (1900)American Duck Shooting (Classics of American Sport) (1901) (Reprint: Stackpole Books, 1991) The Punishment of the Stingy (1901)Alaska 1899: Essays from the Harriman Expedition (1902) (Reprint: University of Washington Press, 1995) American Big Game in Its Haunts (1904) (Reprint: Dodo Press, 2007) American Game-Bird Shooting (1910)Trails of the Pathfinders (1911)Beyond the Old Frontier (1913) Blackfeet Indian Stories (1913) (Reprint: BiblioBazaar, 2007) The Fighting Cheyennes (1915) (Reprint: Kessinger Publishing, 2007) When Buffalo Ran (1920, 2008) The Cheyenne Indians, Vol. 1: History and Society (1923) (Reprint: Bison Books, 1972) The Cheyenne Indians, Vol. 2: War, Ceremonies, and Religion (1923) (Reprint: Bison Books, 1972) By Cheyenne Campfires (1926) (Reprint: University of Nebraska Press, 1971) Two Great Scouts and Their Pawnee Battalion (1928) (Reprint: University of Nebraska Press, 1996) 
  The Boy Scout's Book of True Adventure: Fourteen Honorary Scouts. New York: G. P. Putnam's Sons, 1931.
 Hunting on Three Continents, by George Bird Grinnell, Kermit Roosevelt, W.  Redmond Cross, and Prentiss N. Gray (editors). New York: The Derrydale Press, 1933. -- The seventh book of the Boone and Crockett Club, this wide-ranging collection includes accounts of Expeditions toward the North Pole and to the south of the Equator, articles relating to wild animals, and other pieces that speak the perils of hunting game to the brink of extinction.The Last of the Buffalo (American Environmental Studies), (Ayer Co Pub, 1970) The Passing of the Great West, (Winchester Press, 1972) The Whistling Skeleton: American Indian Tales of the Supernatural, (Four Winds Press, 1982) My Life As an Indian: The Story of a Red Woman and a White Man in the Lodges of the Blackfeet, (Kessinger Publishing, 2005) Native American Ways: Four Paths to Enlightenment, (A & D Publishing, 2007) 

References

Further reading
 Merchant, Carolyn, Spare the Birds! George Bird Grinnell and the First Audubon Society.'' New Haven, CT: Yale University Press, 2016.

External links

 
 
 
 
 Guide to the George Bird Grinnell Papers at the University of Montana Contains journal entries and correspondence of George Bird Grinnell
 Guide to the George Bird Grinnell Papers (MS 1388). Manuscripts and Archives, Yale University Library. The George Bird Grinnell Papers consist of letterpress copybooks, correspondence, subject files, and other papers documenting the life and work of George Bird Grinnell, particularly his pioneering efforts in the American conservation movement. The papers highlight Grinnell's interest in wildlife preservation and the American West and its Indians and his role as a prolific author of books and articles on these subjects. While the papers date from 1859, they contain relatively little material from Grinnell's family, childhood, student days, years teaching at Yale, and first years with Forest and Stream. The bulk of the material represents Grinnell's career from his mid-thirties until the end of his life.
 

1849 births
1938 deaths
American anthropologists
American conservationists
American naturalists
American magazine editors
Yale University alumni
Burials at Woodlawn Cemetery (Bronx, New York)